Zechariah was a person in the Hebrew Bible traditionally considered the author of the Book of Zechariah, the eleventh of the Twelve Minor Prophets.

Prophet 

The Book of Zechariah introduces him as the son of Berechiah, the son of Iddo. The Book of Ezra names Zechariah as the son of Iddo, but it is likely that Berechiah was Zechariah's father, and Iddo was his grandfather. His prophetical career probably began in the second year of Darius the Great, king of the Achaemenid Empire (520 BCE). His greatest concern appears to have been with the building of the Second Temple.

Possible allusion by Jesus

He was probably not the "Zacharias" mentioned by Jesus in the Gospel of Luke and the Gospel of Matthew, "from the blood of innocent Abel to the blood of Zacharias the son of Barachiah, whom you murdered between the sanctuary and the altar". Jesus' words are interpreted as: from the first victim of a murder (Abel), to the last martyr (Zechariah), by which Zechariah ben Jehoiada was more likely meant, as representing the last of the martyrs recorded in the Masoretic Text. However, some scholars still identify him with the later prophet Zechariah, rather than the priest Zechariah of the 9th century BCE, as the Gospel of Matthew records his name as "Zechariah son of Berechiah", and the prophet Zechariah is indeed listed as the son of Berechiah.

Liturgical commemoration
On the Eastern Orthodox liturgical calendar, his feast day is February 8. He is commemorated in the calendar of saints of the Armenian Apostolic Church on the Tuesday after the fifth Sunday of Pentecost and, with the other Minor Prophets, on July 31.  The Roman Catholic Church honors him with a feast day assigned to September 6.

See also
 Tomb of the Prophets Haggai, Zechariah and Malachi
 Zechariah (given name) for the derivation and translations of his name
 Zechariah (priest), the father of John the Baptist in the New Testament

Notes

References

Footnotes

Bibliography
 

6th-century BCE Jews
6th-century BC religious leaders
Ancient apocalypticists
Angelic visionaries
Christian saints from the Old Testament